Limosilactobacillus reuteri is a lactic acid bacterium found in a variety of natural environments, including the gastrointestinal tract of humans and other animals. It does not appear to be pathogenic and may have health effects.

Discovery 
At the turn of the 20th century, L. reuteri was recorded in scientific classifications of lactic acid bacteria, though at this time it was mistakenly grouped as a member of Lactobacillus fermentum. In the 1960s, further work by microbiologist Gerhard Reuter, for whom the species eventually was named, reclassified the species as L. fermentum biotype II.

Significant differences were found between biotype II and other biotypes of L. fermentum, to the point that in 1980 it was identified as a distinct species and the formal species identity, L. reuteri, was proposed. In April 2020, L. reuteri was reassigned to the genus Limosilactobacillus.

Prevalence 
Limosilactobacillus reuteri is found in a variety of natural environments. It has been isolated from many foods, especially meats and dairy products. It appears to be essentially ubiquitous in the animal kingdom, having been found in the gastrointestinal tracts and feces of healthy humans, sheep, chickens, pigs, and rodents. It is the only species to constitute a "major component" of the Lactobacillus species present in the gut of each of the tested host animals, and each host seems to harbor its own specific strain of L. reuteri. It is possible that L. reuteri contributes to the health of its host organism in some manner.

Limosilactobacillus reuteri is present as a dominant member of fermenting organisms in type II sourdoughs; several metabolic traits of L. reuteri, including exopolysaccharide formation and conversion of glutamine to glutamate, improve bread quality.

Effects

Antimicrobial 
Limosilactobacillus reuteri is known to produce reuterin, reutericin 6 and reutericyclin.

Reuterin 
In the late 1980s, Walter Dobrogosz, Ivan Casas and colleagues discovered that L. reuteri produced a novel broad-spectrum antibiotic substance via the organism's fermentation of glycerol. They named this substance reuterin, after Reuter. Reuterin is a multiple-compound dynamic equilibrium (HPA system, HPA) consisting of 3-hydroxypropionaldehyde, its hydrate, and its dimer. At concentrations above 1.4 M, the HPA dimer was predominant. However, at concentrations relevant for biological systems, HPA hydrate was the most abundant, followed by the aldehyde form.

Reuterin inhibits the growth of some harmful Gram-negative and Gram-positive bacteria, along with yeasts, fungi and protozoa. Researchers found that L. reuteri can secrete sufficient amounts of reuterin to achieve the desired antimicrobial effects. Furthermore, since about four to five times the amount of reuterin is needed to kill "good" gut bacteria (i.e. L. reuteri and other Lactobacillus species) as "bad", this would allow L. reuteri to remove gut invaders without harming other gut microbiota.

Some studies questioned whether reuterin production is essential for L. reuteris health-promoting activity. The discovery that it produces an antibiotic substance led to a great deal of further research. In early 2008, L. reuteri was confirmed to be capable of producing reuterin in the gastrointestinal tract, improving its ability to inhibit the growth of E. coli.

The gene cluster controlling the biosynthesis of reuterin and cobalamin in the L. reuteri genome is a genomic island acquired from an anomalous source.

Clinical results in humans 
Although L. reuteri occurs naturally in humans, it is not found in all individuals. Dietary supplementation can sustain high levels of it in those with deficiencies. Oral intake of L. reuteri has been shown to effectively colonize the intestines of healthy individuals. Colonization begins within days of ingestion, although levels drop months later if intake is stopped. L. reuteri is found in breast milk. Oral intake on the mother's part increases the amount of L. reuteri present in her milk, and the likelihood that it will be transferred to the child.

Safety 
Manipulation of gut microbiota is a complex process that may cause bacteria-host interactions. Although probiotics in general are considered safe, concerns exist about their use in certain cases. Some people, such as those with compromised immune systems, short bowel syndrome, central venous catheters, heart valve disease, and premature infants, may be at higher risk for adverse events. Rarely, consumption of probiotics may cause bacteremia, fungemia and sepsis, potentially fatal infections, in children with compromised immune systems or who are already critically ill.

Intestinal health 
One of the better documented effects of L. reuteri is a significant reduction of symptom duration in pediatric diarrheal disease. L. reuteri is effective as a prophylactic for this illness; children fed it while healthy are less likely to fall ill with diarrhea. With regard to prevention of gut infections, comparative research found L. reuteri to be more potent than other probiotics. Animal research found it to reduce motor complexes and thus intestinal motility.

Limosilactobacillus reuteri may be effective treating necrotizing enterocolitis in preterm infants. Meta-analysis of randomized studies suggests that L. reuteri can reduce the incidence of sepsis and shorten the required duration of hospital treatment in this population.

Limosilactobacillus reuteri is an effective treatment against infant colic. Studies suggest that colicky infants treated with L. reuteri experience a reduction in time spent crying compared to those treated with simethicone or placebo. However, colic is still poorly understood, and it is not clear why or how L. reuteri ameliorates its symptoms. One theory holds that affected infants cry because of gastrointestinal discomfort; if this is the case, it is plausible that L. reuteri somehow acts to lessen this discomfort, since its primary residence is inside the gut.

Gastric health 
Limosilactobacillus reuteri have a pronounced anti-helicobacter activity and its use as adjuvant therapy of H. pylori in children appears to be very promising, especially in the case of detection of infection with H. pylori with no absolute indication of eradication. 

Growing evidence indicates L. reuteri is capable of fighting the gut pathogen Helicobacter pylori, which causes peptic ulcers and is endemic in parts of the developing world. One study showed dietary supplementation of L. reuteri alone reduces, but does not eradicate, H. pylori in the gut. Another study found the addition of L. reuteri to omeprazole therapy dramatically increased (from 0% to 60%) the cure rate of H. pylori-infected patients compared to the drug alone. Yet another study showed that L. reuteri effectively suppressed H. pylori infection and decreased the occurrence of dyspeptic symptoms, although it did not improve the outcome of antibiotic therapy.

Llimosilactobacillus reuteri has the potential to suppress H. Pylori infection and may lead to an improvement of H. Pylori-associated gastrointestinal symptoms, reducing specific symptoms such as diarrhea and frequent abdominal distention. In the future, L. reuteri can become a central part of a strategy to avoid using antibiotics and fighting antibiotic resistance in H. pylori infections and besides fighting antibiotics resistance, L. reuteri may be a great alternative treatment for H. pylori causing fewer side effects than antibiotics.

Oral health 
Limosilactobacillus reuteri may be capable of promoting dental health, as it has been proven to kill Streptococcus mutans, a bacterium responsible for tooth decay. A screen of several probiotic bacteria found L. reuteri was the only tested species able to block S. mutans. Before testing in humans began, another study showed L. reuteri had no harmful effects on teeth. Clinical trials proved that people whose mouths are colonized with L. reuteri (via dietary supplementation) have significantly less S. mutans. Since these studies were short-term, it is not known whether L. reuteri prevents tooth decay. However, since it is able to reduce the numbers of an important decay-causing bacterium, this would be expected.

Gingivitis may be ameliorated by consumption of L. reuteri. Patients afflicted with severe gingivitis showed decreased gum bleeding, plaque formation and other gingivitis-associated symptoms compared with placebo after chewing gum containing L. reuteri.

Bone density 
Lactobacillus reuteri and other probiotics may influence the gut microbiome in ways that protect against bone loss, common in post-menopausal women.

General health 
By protecting against many common infections, L. reuteri promotes overall wellness in both children and adults. Double-blind, randomized studies in child care centers have found L. reuteri-fed infants fall sick less often, require fewer doctor visits and are absent fewer days from the center compared to placebo and to the competing probiotic Bifidobacterium lactis.

Similar results have been found in adults; those consuming L. reuteri daily end up falling ill 50% less often, as measured by their decrease use of sick leave.

Results in animal models
Scientific studies that require harming the subjects (for example, exposing them to a dangerous virus) cannot be conducted in humans. Therefore, many of L. reuteri's benefits have been studied only in different animal species, such as pigs and mice.

In general, animal studies on L. reuteri are done using the species-specific strain of the bacterium.

Protection against pathogens 
Limosilactobacillus reuteri confers a high level of resistance to the pathogen Salmonella typhimurium, halving mortality rates in mice. The same is true for chickens and turkeys; L. reuteri greatly moderates the morbidity and mortality caused by this dangerous food-borne pathogen.

Limosilactobacillus reuteri is effective in stopping harmful strains of E. coli from affecting their hosts. A study performed in chickens showed L. reuteri was as potent as the antibiotic gentamicin in preventing E. coli-related deaths.

The protozoic parasite Cryptosporidium parvum causes severe watery diarrhea, which can become life-threatening in immunocompromised (as in individuals infected with HIV) patients. L. reuteri is known to lessen the symptoms of C. parvum infection in mice and pigs.

Some protective effect against the yeast Candida albicans has been found in mice, but in this case, L. reuteri did not work as well as other probiotic organisms, such as L. acidophilus and L. casei.

Body weight and growth 
In juvenile commercial livestock, such as turkey poults and piglets, body weight and growth rate are good health indicators. Animals raised in the dirty, crowded environments of commercial farms are generally less healthy (and therefore weigh less) than their counterparts born and bred in cleaner spaces. In turkeys, for example, this phenomenon is known as "poult growth depression", or PGD.

Supplementing the diets of these young animals with L. reuteri helps them to largely overcome the stresses imposed by unhealthy environs. Commercial turkeys fed L. reuteri from birth had nearly a 10% higher adult body weight than their peers raised in the same conditions. A similar study on piglets showed L. reuteri is at least as effective as synthetic antibiotics in improving body weight under crowded conditions.

The mechanism by which L. reuteri is able to support healthy growth is not entirely understood. It possibly serves to protect against illness caused by S. typhimurium and other pathogens (see above), which are much more common in crowded commercial farms. However, other studies found that it can help when the growth depression is caused entirely by a lack of dietary protein, and not by contagious disease. This raises the possibility that L. reuteri somehow improves the intestines' ability to absorb and process nutrients.

Chemical and trauma-induced injury 
Treating colonic tissue from rats with acetic acid causes an injury similar to the human condition ulcerative colitis. Treating the injured tissue with L. reuteri immediately after removing the acid almost completely reverses any ill effects, leading to the possibility that L. reuteri may be beneficial in the treatment of human colitis patients.

In addition to its role in digestion, the intestinal wall is also vital in preventing harmful bacteria, endotoxins, etc., from "leaking" into the bloodstream. This leaking, known as bacterial "translocation", can lead to lethal conditions such as sepsis. In humans, translocation is more likely to occur following such events as liver injury and ingestion of some poisons. In rodent studies, L. reuteri was found to greatly reduce the amount of bacterial translocation following either the surgical removal of the liver or injection with D-galactosamine, a chemical which causes liver damage.

The anticancer drug methotrexate causes severe enterocolitis in high doses. L. reuteri greatly mitigates the symptoms of methotrexate-induced enterocolitis in rats, one of which is bacterial translocation.

Links to fat in diet of mice, and reversible symptoms of behavioral abnormalities 
In mice, the absence of L. reuteri has been causally linked to maternal diet. A gut microbial imbalance, lacking in L. reuteri, was linked to behavioral abnormalities consistent with autism in humans. These symptoms were reversible by supplementing L. reuteri.

References

External links 
 Joint Genome Institute on L. reuteri
 
Type strain of Lactobacillus reuteri at BacDive -  the Bacterial Diversity Metadatabase

Digestive system
Probiotics
Lactobacillaceae
Gut flora bacteria
Bacteria described in 1982